Sharon Isbin (born in Minneapolis) is a classical guitarist and the founding director of the guitar department at the Juilliard School.

Personal life and education
Sharon Isbin was born in Minneapolis, Minnesota, to attorney Katherine Brudnoy and Herbert S. Isbin, a nuclear scientist and professor at the University of Minnesota. She began her guitar studies at age nine with Aldo Minella in Varese, Italy. She later studied with Jeffrey Van, Sophocles Papas, Andrés Segovia, Oscar Ghiglia, Alirio Díaz and for ten years with the noted keyboard artist and Bach scholar Rosalyn Tureck. Isbin collaborated with Tureck in preparing landmark first performance editions of the Bach lute suites for guitar, published by G Schirmer, and recorded by Isbin as Complete Bach Lute Suites on Warner Classics. Isbin created and directs guitar departments at the Aspen Music Festival and the Juilliard School.

She began practicing Transcendental Meditation at age 17. She received a B.A. cum laude from Yale University and a Master of Music (M.M.) from the Yale School of Music.

In 1995 Isbin came out as a lesbian in a profile by Out magazine. She wanted to come out a year earlier but her manager told her not to, only changing their mind after k.d. lang and Melissa Etheridge found success as out musicians the following year.

Music career

Performing and recording
Isbin has appeared as soloist with over 200 orchestras, and has commissioned more concertos than any other guitarist—including works by John Corigliano, Tan Dun, Aaron Jay Kernis, Joseph Schwantner, Lukas Foss, Chris Brubeck, and Christopher Rouse.

In 2015, she performed with Josh Groban on PBS's Billy Joel: Gershwin Prize concert, and in February 2015 she was featured on the Tavis Smiley PBS television series.

In 2005, Isbin performed a world premiere of Blossom Suite along with the composer, rock guitarist Steve Vai. Her earliest crossover collaborations began with Brazilian guitarist Laurindo Almeida and jazz guitarist Larry Coryell. In 2014, she performed a 20-city Guitar Passions tour with jazz musicians Stanley Jordan and Romero Lubambo.

Other composers who have written for Isbin include Joan Tower, David Diamond, Ned Rorem, Howard Shore, John Duarte, Leo Brouwer, and Bruce MacCombie. New York's Carnegie Hall and Chicago's Harris Theater commissioned composer Richard Danielpour to write a song cycle for Isbin and mezzo-soprano Isabel Leonard to commemorate the 125th anniversary of Carnegie Hall.  She has premiered over 80 works by world-renowned composers. 

Isbin's catalogue of over 35 recordings has sold nearly one million copies and ranges from Baroque music, Spanish/Latin and 20th century to crossover and jazz fusion. Her most recent releases are AFFINITY: World Premiere Recordings, and STRINGS FOR PEACE: Premieres for Guitar & Sarod with Amjad Ali Khan, both of which were named Best of 2020 by NPR, SiriusXM and multiple media.  Her Souvenirs of Spain & Italy (Cedille) with the Pacifica Quartet debuted at number two on the Billboard charts and at number one on Amazon. Her Alma Espanola (Bridge) with mezzo-soprano Isabel Leonard was honored by a 2018 GRAMMY Award for Producer of the Year, Classical. The acclaimed one-hour documentary Sharon Isbin: Troubadour won the 2015 ASCAP Television Broadcast Award. In October 2014, Warner Classics released a 5-CD box set of her most popular albums titled Sharon Isbin: 5 Classic Albums. Her 2011 release, Sharon Isbin & Friends: Guitar Passions (Sony), became a bestseller on Amazon.com, and includes guest artists Steve Vai, Stanley Jordan, Nancy Wilson, Steve Morse, Romero Lubambo, Rosa Passos, Thiago de Mello, and Paul Winter.

Awards and nominations
Boston magazine called Isbin "the pre-eminent guitarist of our time". She was the winner of Guitar Player magazine's Best Classical Guitarist award. Isbin has also won the following awards:

 First Prize at the Toronto Guitar '75 competition
 Winner Munich ARD International Music Competition, 1976
 The Madrid Queen Sofia
 Concert Artists Guild 2013 Virtuoso Award
 Germany's Echo Klassik Award

Isbin also won Musical America’s 2020 Instrumentalist of the Year, becoming the first guitarist in their 59 award year history to receive the award. She was the first guitarist to win the Munich ARD International Competition. 

Isbin won a Grammy Award in 2001 for Dreams of a World: Folk-Inspired Music for Guitar (Warner Classics) for "Best Instrumental Soloist", becoming the first classical guitarist to win a Grammy in 28 years. Her world premiere recording of concertos written for her by Christopher Rouse and Tan Dun won a Grammy in 2002. In 2010, Isbin won another Grammy Award for Best Instrumental Soloist for her CD Journey to the New World (Sony), which includes guests Joan Baez and Mark O'Connor. The album spent 63 consecutive weeks on the top of the Billboard charts and was ranked as the number one bestselling classical CD on Amazon.com and iTunes during that time.

She received a 2005 Latin Grammy nomination for "Best Classical Album" and a 2006 GLAAD Media Award nomination for "Outstanding Music Artist" for her recording of Joaquín Rodrigo's Concierto de Aranjuez with the New York Philharmonic. The recording also featured concertos by Mexican composer Manuel Ponce and Brazilian Heitor Villa-Lobos. Isbin was the first guitar soloist to perform with the New York Philharmonic in 26 years, and the recording was also the New York Philharmonic's first-ever recording with guitar.

Her album Journey to the Amazon received a 1999 Grammy nomination for "Best Classical Crossover Album".

Her CD of Aaron Jay Kernis' Double Concerto with violinist Cho-Liang Lin and the Saint Paul Chamber Orchestra received a 2000 Grammy nomination.

On September 11, 2002, Isbin's performance for the memorial tribute at Ground Zero was televised live throughout the world. 

In November 2009, Isbin performed a concert at the White House by invitation of President Obama and First Lady Michelle Obama.

Teaching and other work
In 1989, Isbin created the Master of Music degree, Graduate Diploma and Artist Diploma for classical guitar at the Juilliard School, and becoming the founding director of their guitar department; she added the Bachelor of Music degree and Undergraduate Diploma to the program in 2007, and the Doctor of Musical Arts in 2018.

Isbin is the author of the Classical Guitar Answer Book, and is director of the Guitar Department at the Aspen Music Festival.

On November 5, 2015, the David Lynch Foundation organized a benefit concert at New York City's Carnegie Hall named "Change Begins Within", to promote transcendental meditation for stress control. Sharon Isbin participated alongside the likes of Katy Perry, Sting, Jerry Seinfeld, Angelique Kidjo and Jim James.

Awards

Grammy
 1999: Grammy nomination for Best Classical Crossover Album, Journey to the Amazon 
 2000: Grammy nomination, Kernis: Double Concerto for Violin and Guitar with Cho-Liang Lin and the Saint Paul Chamber Orchestra  
 2001: Grammy Award for Best Instrumental Soloist, Dreams of a World 
 2002: Grammy Award for Rouse: Concert de Gaudi
 2005: Latin Grammy nomination for Best Classical Album, Rodrigo: Concierto de Aranjuez; Villa-Lobos: Concerto for guitar; Ponce: Concierto del Sur with the New York Philharmonic 
 2010: Grammy Award for Best Instrumental Soloist, Journey to the New World

Other awards
 Toronto Guitar competition, first prize, 1975 
 Winner Munich ARD International Music Competition, 1976
 Madrid Queen Sofia International Competition, 1979
 Echo Klassik Award, Winner Best Concert Recording, 2002
 Concert Artists Guild Virtuoso Award, 2013
 ASCAP Television Broadcast Award, 2015 
 Little Orchestra Society's Artistic Excellence Award, 2019 
 Musical America 2020 Instrumentalist of the Year Award
 Best Classical Guitarist, Guitar Player magazine

Discography

References

External links 
 Official Website

1956 births
20th-century American guitarists
20th-century American women guitarists
21st-century American women guitarists
21st-century American guitarists
American classical guitarists
Articles containing video clips
Aspen Music Festival and School faculty
Classical musicians from Minnesota
Educators from Minnesota
American women educators
Grammy Award winners
Guitarists from Minnesota
Juilliard School faculty
LGBT classical musicians
American LGBT musicians
LGBT people from Minnesota
Living people
Musicians from Minneapolis
Women classical guitarists
Women music educators
Cedille Records artists